The Carrollton Heist is the second collaborative album by American rapper Curren$y and American record producer The Alchemist. The album is a follow up to their 2011 collaborative effort Covert Coup, and like this album, features 10 tracks with guest appearances from Styles P, Action Bronson & Lil Wayne.

Track listing
 All songs produced by The Alchemist

 Cartridge
 Black Rally Stripes
 Vibrations
 Disappearing Ink (feat. Styles P)
 Inspiration (feat. Action Bronson)
 500 Pounds of Gas
 The Mack Book
 93 AMG
 Fat Albert (feat. Lil Wayne)
 Smoking in the Rain

2016 albums